Louis Roeder (1835–1915) was a member of the governing body of Los Angeles, California, in the 19th century, who rose from being a pioneer blacksmith and carriage maker to one of the wealthiest landowners in the city.

Personal

Roeder was born in Germany in 1835 and emigrated to New York City in 1851, when he was fifteen years old. He remained there for six years and then, having heard "wonderful stories of California, and although not interested in the Gold Rush," he came to San Francisco via the Isthmus of Panama, and then south to San Pedro aboard the steamship Senator. He lived for a time at the Bella Union Hotel near the Los Angeles Plaza.

He was married to Wilhelmina Huth in 1886, and

the entire town was invited to attend. Every one took a holiday and went to the wedding. There was a church ceremony and then the entire town went to the Old Mission[,] where the banquet was spread. Every wagon, saddle horse and conveyance of every other kind was at a premium that day[,] and those who could not ride started early and walked.

The couple first lived in a house on the corner of Fourth and Main streets, where the Farmers & Merchants Bank later stood.  In 1906 they were living at 1137 Westlake Avenue in today's Echo Park district

Roeder was the oldest member of the Los Angeles chapter of the Independent Order of Odd Fellows and of the Los Angeles Turnverein Society.

He died on February 20, 1915, leaving his widow and three daughters — Mrs. Charles Dodge, Mrs. Frank Johanson and Mrs. John T. Joughin — and two sons — Henry Roeder of Los Angeles and Louis Roeder of San Francisco.

Vocation

Trained as a woodworker, Roeder began his vocation in Los Angeles by "placing of from twenty to thirty draw bands on the leaking wooden pipes of the city's water system." He worked for a wagon-maker, "and it came about that his employer owned him $800, while at the same time a customer owed a like amount, and wished to pay it" with a lot he owned on Main Street between Second and Third streets. Roeder "agreed to take the property, although he did not half like the idea."

Roeder opened his own blacksmithing and a carriage-making shop on what was then the outskirts of Los Angeles, at First and Spring Streets, where the Nadeau Hotel was later built. "He bought it for practically nothing, and realized a great profit when he sold the hotel site."

He began buying land when "property in the city had scarcely any value," Los Angeles being "regarded by outsiders as a very bad town for business, even San Diego looking down upon it." In 1874 he bought  land on Spring Street, where he later built the Roeder Block, paying $5,000 to "McLaughlin, the owner of the overland stage line ... which was considered a good price at the time, the lot being so far south of the business center."

Common Council

Roeder was a member of the Los Angeles Common Council, the governing body of the city, beginning on May 10, 1866, and ending on June 23, 1870, when he resigned.

References and notes

American blacksmiths
Businesspeople from Los Angeles
Los Angeles Common Council (1850–1889) members
19th-century American politicians
1835 births
1915 deaths
German emigrants to the United States
19th century in Los Angeles
19th-century American businesspeople